Snake wine is an alcoholic beverage produced by infusing whole snakes in rice wine or grain alcohol. The drink was first recorded to have been consumed in China during the Western Zhou dynasty (c. 1040–770 BC) and considered an important curative and believed to reinvigorate a person according to Traditional Chinese medicine. It can be found in China, North-Korea, Goa (India), Vietnam,  Okinawa (Japan), Laos, Thailand, Cambodia and throughout Southeast Asia.

The snakes, preferably venomous ones, are not usually preserved for their meat but to have their "essence" and/or snake venom dissolved in the liquor. The snake venom proteins are unfolded by the ethanol and therefore the completed beverage is usually, but not always, safe to drink.
The Huaxi street night market of Taipei, Taiwan, is renowned for its snake foods and wine products.

History 
Snakes and their viscera have long been considered by followers of Traditional Chinese Medicine to be invaluable for the promotion of vitality and health. The drink was first recorded to be used in China during the Western Zhou dynasty (771 BC) and the medicinal use of snakes was noted in the medical manual Shen nong ben cao jing compiled between 300 B.C. and 200 A.D. The detailed use of various snake feces, their body parts, and various preparations were greatly elaborated in Li Shizhen's Bencao Gangmu. Snake bile was offered to Yang Jisheng as treatment for the injuries he suffered in prison circa 1554.

Claims of medicinal value 
Snakes are widely believed to possess medicinal qualities and the wine is often advertised to cure everything from farsightedness to hair loss, as well as to increase sexual performance. In Vietnam, the common regional name for snake wines is rượu thuốc, while less common ones are referred to as rượu rắn. In Vietnamese culture it is believed by some individuals that snake wine can improve health and virility. A similar drink is made with dehydrated geckos or sea horses rather than snakes. Snake wine, due to its high alcohol percentage, is traditionally drunk in shot glasses.

It is illegal to import snake wine to many countries because many of the snakes used for its production are endangered species.

Health risks 
The risks of ingesting snake wine include systemic envenomation from the contained venom, which may present features differing from direct envenomation by snakebite. A number of health problems of the vascular system may result, including damage to the vascular wall endothelium, abnormal platelet function and activation, and coagulopathy.

Varieties 

There are two main types of snake wine, which utilize either parts of a live snake, or the entire snake itself.
Steeped: A whole venomous snake is placed into a glass jar of rice wine or grain alcohol, sometimes along with smaller snakes and medicinal herbs and left to steep for many months. The wine is drunk as a restorative in small shots or cups. The snakes may be inserted into the container while still alive, causing them to drown on their own, or the snake may be stunned first by being placed on ice, after which the distiller cuts the snake open, guts it, and then sews it shut again. Upon removal from the ice, the snake will briefly reawaken and thrash around, before curling into an aggressive striking pose and dying. The latter method is sometimes preferred because the removal of the snake's digestive tract can noticeably reduce the pungent smell of the finished wine, and because the snakes often die in a coiled position that is visually attractive inside the jars, suggesting the snake was fierce in spirit.
Mixed: The fresh body fluids of the snake are mixed directly into prepared alcohol and consumed immediately in the form of a shot. Snake blood wine is prepared by slicing a snake along its belly and draining its blood directly into the drinking vessel filled with rice wine or grain alcohol. Snake bile wine is made by mixing the alcohol with the snake's gall bladder and bile, and snake heart wine is made by putting the still-beating heart of the slaughtered snake into a bottle of alcohol.

See also 

Elixir
Folk medicine
Habushu
Panacea
Theriaca
Rượu thuốc
Snake oil

References 

Folklore
Rice wine
Vietnamese alcoholic drinks
Asian traditional medicine
Snake products